Vadia can refer to:
 Vadia (Narmada), village in Narmada district, Gujarat, India
 Vadia, Saurashtra,  census town in Amreli district, Gujarat, India
 Vadia, Banaskantha,  village in Banaskantha district, Gujarat, India